Minuscule 768 (in the Gregory-Aland numbering), ε480 (von Soden), is a Greek minuscule manuscript of the New Testament written on parchment. Palaeographically it has been assigned to the 12th century. The manuscript has no complex contents. Scrivener labelled it as 859e.

Description 
The codex contains the text of the four Gospels, on 222 parchment leaves (size ), with one lacuna. The text is written in one column per page, 16-24 lines per page. It lacks text of Matthew 1:1-9:15. The text of Matthew 3:6-9:15 was supplied by the 15th century hand, the text of Matthew 1:1-2:25 by the 16th century hand on paper.

Text 
The Greek text of the codex is a representative of the Byzantine text-type. Hermann von Soden classified it to the textual family Kx. Aland placed it in Category V.

According to the Claremont Profile Method it represents textual family Kx in Luke 1 and Luke 20. In Luke 10 no profile was made.

It lacks the Pericope Adulterae (John 7:53-8:11).

History 
F. H. A. Scrivener dated the manuscript to the 14th century; C. R. Gregory dated the manuscript to the 12th century. The manuscript is currently dated by the INTF to the 12th century.

The manuscript was the first time noticed in catalogue from 1876.

It was added to the list of New Testament manuscripts by Scrivener (859) and Gregory (768). Gregory saw the manuscript in 1886.

The manuscript is now housed at the National Library of Greece (161) in Athens.

See also 

 List of New Testament minuscules
 Biblical manuscript
 Textual criticism
 Minuscule 766

References

Further reading 

 

Greek New Testament minuscules
12th-century biblical manuscripts
Manuscripts of the National Library of Greece